Mikana is an unincorporated community in Barron County, Wisconsin, United States. Mikana is situated on the western shore of Red Cedar Lake and is southwest of Birchwood, in the town of Cedar Lake.

History
Mikana  was platted in 1902, soon after the railroad was extended to that point. Mikana is an Ojibwe word meaning "road" (or "trail"). Mikana had a post office, which opened on June 3, 1902, and closed on October 21, 1995.

Attractions
Mikana is known in the region for its Fourth of July celebration, in particular its parade which is colloquially referred to as "The Biggest Littlest Fourth of July Parade."

Images

References

Unincorporated communities in Barron County, Wisconsin
Unincorporated communities in Wisconsin